Sheridan F. Master (March 7, 1869June 5, 1927) was a Michigan politician.

Early life 
Master was born on March 7, 1869, in Ontario, Canada to parents Levi and Maria Master.

Personal life 
Master married Helen C. Harrison on November 20, 1895, in Chicago, Illinois.

Career 
Master served as the Kalamazoo County Prosecuting Attorney from 1901 to 1902. Master was a failed 1905 candidate for circuit judge in Michigan 9th Circuit Court. Master served as a member of the Michigan House of Representatives from the Kalamazoo County 1st district from 1913 to 1918. From 1917 to 1918, he also served as Speaker of the Michigan House of Representatives.

Death 
Master died in Lansing, Michigan, on June 5, 1927. He was interred in Oakhill Cemetery in Grand Rapids, Michigan.

References 

1869 births
1927 deaths
Michigan lawyers
Speakers of the Michigan House of Representatives
Republican Party members of the Michigan House of Representatives
Burials in Michigan
20th-century American lawyers
20th-century American politicians
19th-century American lawyers